Chen Tao may refer to:

Chen Tao (True Way Cult), a religious group that originated in 20th-century Taiwan
Chen Tao (boxer) (born 1972), Chinese boxer
Chen Tao (poet) (824–882), Tang Dynasty poet
Chen Tao (footballer, born 1985), Chinese association footballer
Chen Tao (footballer, born 1995), Chinese association footballer
Chen Yufan (born Chen Tao, 1975), Chinese actor and singer